Caroline Laforge (born 28 April 1991) is a retired Belgian volleyball player. She last played as outside hitter for Belgian club VC Lessines. Caroline is the sister of former Belgium women's national volleyball team member and Dauphines Charleroi setter Celine Laforge.

References

External links
Caroline Laforge at CEV.eu

1991 births
Living people
Belgian women's volleyball players
21st-century Belgian women